Second Canyon Cone, also called Canyon Creek Cone is a cinder cone in the Boundary Ranges of the Coast Mountains in northwestern British Columbia, Canada. It is a volcanic feature of the Iskut-Unuk River Cones which is part of the Northern Cordilleran Volcanic Province and formed in the past 10,000 years of the Holocene epoch.

See also
 List of volcanoes in Canada
 List of Northern Cordilleran volcanoes
 Volcanism of Canada
 Volcanism of Western Canada

References

Cinder cones of British Columbia
Northern Cordilleran Volcanic Province
Boundary Ranges